Alexandros "Alex" Margaritis (born 20 September 1984) is a Greek-German racing driver who is best known for competing in the German-based Deutsche Tourenwagen Masters touring car championship. Prior to that, his career had focused on formula single seater racing in Europe. Margaritis has dual nationality as a result of his place of birth and Greek parentage.

Karting and formula racing
Margaritis had his first experience of karting in 1996, and in 1997, he competed in the ICA Junior class, in which he secured the championship runner-up position. He spent the next two seasons competing in the International Junior class in Germany, finishing 4th overall in 1999. In the following year, Margaritis made his single seater formula debut in the Formula BMW ADAC championship. In 2001, he achieved three podium finishes and one pole position on the way to 6th in the championship standings.

After one season in German Formula Renault, in which he finished 7th overall, Margaritis made his Formula Three debut in the first season of the new Formula 3 Euro Series. He achieved one podium finish and two pole positions during the first year and retained a place in the series in 2004.

Touring cars

In 2005, Margaritis moved from formula racing to touring cars when an opportunity arose in one of Europe's most high-profile touring car championships. He was signed by Mücke Motorsport, which was making the same transition between disciplines.

In a 2004-specification AMG Mercedes C Klasse, Margaritis did not achieve any points finishes; his best finish was 9th place at Spa-Francorchamps. He then moved to Persson Motorsport as the third driver in its 2006 line-up alongside Mathias Lauda and Jean Alesi. He was classified 11th in the standings, with a total of 11 points, and achieved a best finish of 5th position in the season's first race. Persson retained his services in 2007 alongside Paul di Resta and Gary Paffett. He finished 10th in the overall drivers standings with 16 points, achieving two 4th places.

On 27 February 2008, Margaritis announced his intention to leave the DTM and seek a position in another championship or category, citing as a primary factor the handicap of competing in year-old cars against machinery of factory specification.

Grand Tourers
In 2008, Margaritis switched his focus to GT cars: He competed in the 24 Hours of Spa for Phoenix Racing. The Corvette C6.R failed to finish the race and was classified 37th.

After one season without racing in major series, Margaritis participated in the newly created FIA GT1 World Championship. He drove for Triple H Team Hegersport and Phoenix Racing. In spite of not participating in all events he finished 7th in the overall standings.

Margaritis switched to the ADAC GT Masters in 2011. He and his partner Dino Lunardi won the driver's championship in their BMW ALPINA B6 GT3. In 2012 Margaritis switched to Team Heico to share a car with Lance David Arnold. The pairing finished 18th in their Mercedes-Benz SLS AMG GT3. 
Heico hired Magaritis for the 2011 and 2012 editions of the 24 Hours Nürburgring as well.

2013 saw Margaritis getting a part-time drive for H&R Spezialfedern GmbH & Co in the VLN.

Racing record

Complete Formula 3 Euro Series results
(key) (Races in bold indicate pole position) (Races in italics indicate fastest lap)

Complete Deutsche Tourenwagen Masters results
(key) (Races in bold indicate pole position) (Races in italics indicate fastest lap)

† — Retired, but was classified as he completed 90% of the winner's race distance.

Complete GT1 World Championship results

Sources
Speedsport Magazine
Official website
Touring Car Times

References

1984 births
Living people
Citizens of Greece through descent
Greek racing drivers
German racing drivers
German Formula Renault 2.0 drivers
Formula Renault Eurocup drivers
Deutsche Tourenwagen Masters drivers
Formula 3 Euro Series drivers
Formula BMW ADAC drivers
Sportspeople from Bonn
German people of Greek descent
Sportspeople of Greek descent
FIA GT1 World Championship drivers
Racing drivers from North Rhine-Westphalia
ADAC GT Masters drivers
24 Hours of Spa drivers
Mercedes-AMG Motorsport drivers
Mücke Motorsport drivers
Phoenix Racing drivers
Ma-con Motorsport drivers
Nürburgring 24 Hours drivers
Engstler Motorsport drivers